Daaka is an Indian Punjabi-language action comedy film directed by Baljit Singh Deo. The film released on November 1, 2019.

Plot 

Daaka is a movie about two poverty-stricken men who have their own set of problems to deal with. One, named Shinda is a love bird who falls for the daughter of a retired school teacher, financially well off, and the other, Balli, the father of a girl child who is suffering from a stomach tumour. Both these men co-own a mobile repair 'khokha' but in order to sustain their business, they must pay the shop owner 2.5 lacs else they'll lose their space. When they manage to somehow gather a handsome sum to pay the shop owner, things take an unplanned turn and they're left with just a plan and that too of robbing their village bank. When they are robbing the bank, the criminal being held in the Jail cell escapes. This leads to a whole sequence of events, leaving both Shinda and Balli wanted by the police.

Cast 

 Gippy Grewal as Shinda
 Zareen Khan as Laali 
 Rana Ranbir as Balli
 Shehnaaz Kaur Gill as Pushpa
 Mukul Dev as Inspector Kuldeep Singh
 Hobby Dhaliwal as Sukhchain
 Rana Jung Bahadur as Sheth Mohan Lal
 Shavinder Mahal as Masterji (Laali's Father)
 Prince Kanwaljit Singh as Constable Beant Singh
 Baninder Bunny as Bank Manager Sukhdev

Production 

Development of the film commenced in 2018. On 27 November 2018, Gippy Grewal worked  with T-Series. On 21 February 2019  principal photography began using cinematographer Baljit Singh Deo. The leads were played by Grewal and Zareen Khan.

This film has a similar plot to Jatt James Bond , a movie starring both Gippy Grewal and Zareen Khan.

Release and marketing 
Gippy Grewal announced Daaka in February 2019. The film was scheduled to be released on 13 September 2019, but it was delayed to 1 November 2019.

Soundtrack 

The music was composed by Jatinder Shah, Rochak Kohli, Payal Dev, Aditya Dev and Jay K. The lyrics were written by Gautam G Sharma, Gurpreet Saini, Happy Raikoti and Kumaar.

Koi Aye Na Rabba is a remake song, originally composed by Vishal–Shekhar for the 2004 film Musafir.

Reception

Critical response 
Gurnaaz Kaur of The Tribune gave the film three and a half stars out of five. Kaur concluded, "The story may be a clichéd one, the execution still gets the thumbs-up. To have such a well-crafted tale in Punjabi cinema is a matter of pride. It reflects the growing technical strength of the industry". Gurlove Singh of BookMyShow said, "Daaka is an interesting story that has been narrated stylishly. The film is absolutely entertaining [...] The film has everything – love, thrill, violence, colorful songs and more. It cannot be denied that Daaka is a complete package".

References

External links
 Daaka Watch online & Download

2019 films
Punjabi-language Indian films
2010s Punjabi-language films
Indian action comedy films
2010s heist films
Indian heist films
2019 action comedy films
Films directed by Baljit Singh Deo